Pournami Raavil is a 1985 Indian Malayalam 3D film, directed by A. Vincent and produced by S. Kumar. The film stars Viji, Vijayendra Ghatge, Anuradha and Janardanan. The film's score was composed by Shankar–Ganesh.

Plot

Pournami Raavil is a fantasy film made in 3D format.

Cast
Viji
Vijayendra Ghatge
Anuradha
Janardhanan

Soundtrack
The music was composed by Shankar–Ganesh with lyrics by P. Bhaskaran.

References

External links
 

1985 films
1980s Malayalam-language films
1985 3D films
Indian 3D films
Films scored by Shankar–Ganesh
Films directed by A. Vincent